The 2008 Men's South American Hockey Championship was the second edition of the Men's South American Hockey Championship, the South American championship for men's national field hockey teams, organized by the PAHF. It was held from 29 March to 6 April 2008 in Montevideo, Uruguay.

Argentina were the defending champions, having won the first edition. They won their second title in a row by finishing first in the round-robin tournament.

Tournament

Pool

Results

References

External links
PAHF page

Men's South American Hockey Championship
South American Championship
South American Hockey Championship Men
International field hockey competitions hosted by Uruguay
South American Hockey Championship Men
South American Hockey Championship Men
Sports competitions in Montevideo
2000s in Montevideo